Imperative may refer to:
Imperative mood, a grammatical mood (or mode) expressing commands, direct requests, and prohibitions
Imperative programming, a programming paradigm in computer science
Imperative logic
Imperative (film), a 1982 German drama film

In philosophy 
Moral imperative, a philosophical concept relating to obligation
Categorical imperative, central philosophical concept in the moral philosophy of Immanuel Kant
Hypothetical imperative, introduced by Immanuel Kant as a commandment of reason that applies only conditionally